Ranjha Refugee is an Indian-Punjabi film directed by Avtar Singh. The film stars Roshan Prince, Saanvi Dhiman, Karamjit Anmol, Harby Sangha and Nisha Bano in lead roles. The film was released on 26 October 2018.

Cast

 Roshan Prince
 Saanvi Dhiman
 Karamjit Anmol
 Harby Sangha
 Nisha Bano
Aman Sidhu

Soundtrack

Receptions

References

External links
 

Punjabi-language Indian films
2010s Punjabi-language films
Indian drama films